Naganur  is a village in the southern state of Karnataka, India. It is located in the Gokak taluk of Belagavi district in Karnataka.

Demographics
According to the 2001 India census, Naganur had a population of 13,459 with 6820 males and 6639 females.

See also
 Gokak
 Belgaum
 Districts of Karnataka

References

External links
 http://Belgaum.nic.in/

Villages in Belagavi district